Jean Rémy Ayouné (June 5, 1914 – December 1992) was the foreign minister of Gabon from 1968 to 1971.

References

1914 births
1992 deaths
Foreign ministers of Gabon